The National Railway Museum of Portugal has its headquarters and main base in the town of Entroncamento, which is also a major hub of the Portuguese rail network and the location of railway workshops. Smaller museums are located in other towns around the country.

The museum at Entroncamento was opened on 18 May 2007. It is open daily (except Mondays) from 10.00 to 16.00.

See also
Comboios de Portugal
History of rail transport in Portugal
Narrow gauge railways in Portugal
List of National Railway Museums

References

External links
Museum information on CP's official website
National Railway Museum Foundation (FMNF), Portugal
CP official website: timeline of Portuguese railway history

National railway museums
National museums of Portugal
Transport museums in Portugal
Museums in Santarém District